Dame Victoria Mary Taylor Heywood,  (born June 1956) is the chairman of Unboxed:_Creativity_in_the_UK and a member of the Board of the National Theatre. She is a former Chairman of Mountview Drama Academy, the RSA, Royal Society of Arts. She is the former Chairman of 14-18 Now the UK's five year commemoration of the First World War. She is the former executive director of the Royal Shakespeare Company and the Royal Court Theatre, London, and ran the London International Festival of Theatre. She was chief executive of the Contact Theatre, Manchester.

Already Commander of the Order of the British Empire (CBE), she was appointed Dame Commander of the Order of the British Empire (DBE) in the 2020 Birthday Honours for services to the arts.

References

External links 
Vikki Heywood talking about the Royal Shakespeare Company.

Royal Society of Arts
Women chief executives
Dames Commander of the Order of the British Empire
British arts administrators
Women arts administrators
1956 births
Living people